Elşad Qadaşev (born 1 May 1968) is an Azerbaijani-Russian former basketball player. He competed in the men's tournament at the 1992 Summer Olympics.

References

1968 births
Living people
Soviet men's basketball players
Russian men's basketball players
Azerbaijani men's basketball players
Olympic basketball players of the Unified Team
Basketball players at the 1992 Summer Olympics
Sportspeople from Baku
BC Dynamo Moscow players
PBC Ural Great players